Do It Dog Style is the first album by Manchester punk band Slaughter and the Dogs.

Track listing
All tracks composed by Wayne Barrett and Mike Rossi except where indicated
Side A
"Where Have All the Boot Boys Gone"
"Victims of the Vampire" (Rossi, Barrett, Bates)
"Boston Babies"
"I'm Waiting for the Man" (Lou Reed)
"I'm Mad"
"Quick Joey Small" (Arthur Resnick, Joey Levine)
Side B
"You're a Bore"
"Keep on Trying" (Rossi, Bates)
"We Don't Care"
"Since You Went Away"
"Who Are the Mystery Girls" (David Johansen, Johnny Thunders)
"Dame to Blame"

Personnel
Slaughter and the Dogs
Wayne Barrett-vocals
Mike Rossi - guitar
Brian “Mad Muffet” Grantham-drums
Howard "Zip" Bates - bass
with:
Mick Ronson - guitar on "Quick Joey Small" and "Who Are the Mystery Girls"
Technical
Adrian Martins - engineer
Steve McGarry - sleeve illustration
Kevin Cummins - photography

References

External links 

 

1978 debut albums
Slaughter & The Dogs albums
Decca Records albums